Tomoxia inundata is a species of beetle in the genus Tomoxia of the family Mordellidae. It was described by Wickham in 1914.

References

Beetles described in 1914
Tomoxia